Tell Me Lies  is an American drama streaming television series created by Meaghan Oppenheimer, based on the 2018 novel of the same name by Carola Lovering. The series was released on Hulu on September 7, 2022. It follows a relationship between Lucy Albright and Stephen DeMarco as it unfolds over the course of 8 years after meeting at college. In November 2022, the series was renewed for a second season.

Cast and characters

Main

 Grace Van Patten as Lucy Albright
 Jackson White as Stephen DeMarco
 Catherine Missal as Bree
 Spencer House as Wrigley
 Sonia Mena as Pippa
 Branden Cook as Evan
 Benjamin Wadsworth as Drew
 Alicia Crowder as Diana

Recurring

 Edmund Donovan as Max
 Natalee Linez as Lydia Montgomery
 Tyriq Withers as Tim
 Gabriella Pession as Marianne

Episodes

Production

Development
On September 1, 2020, it was announced that Emma Roberts has inked a first-look deal at Hulu via her production company, Belletrist TV, and her first project was adapting Carola Lovering's Tell Me Lies for television. On August 3, 2021, it was reported that Hulu had given the production a straight-to-series order. The series is created by Meaghan Oppenheimer is also expected to executive produce alongside Roberts, Karah Preiss, Laura Lewis, and Shannon Gibson. Production companies involved with the series are Belletrist Productions, Rebelle Media, and Vice Studios. On April 14, 2022, Jonathan Levine joined the series to direct the pilot and executive produce the series. The series was released on September 7, 2022.
On November 29, 2022, Hulu renewed the series for a second season.

Casting
Alongside the initial series announcement, it was reported that Grace Van Patten was cast in a lead role. On November 19, 2021, it was announced that Jackson White joined the main cast. On December 9, 2021, it was reported that Sonia Mena, Catherine Missal, and Alicia Crowder were cast as series regulars. On February 4, 2022, it was announced that Branden Cook, Spencer House, and Benjamin Wadsworth joined the cast in starring roles. On April 14, 2022, Gabriella Pession, Edmund Donovan, and Natalee Linez joined the series in recurring capacities.

Reception
The review aggregator website Rotten Tomatoes reported an 86% approval rating with an average rating of 5.7/10, based on 7 critic reviews. Metacritic, which uses a weighted average, assigned a score of 65 out of 100 based on 8 critics, indicating "generally favorable reviews".

References

External links
 
 

2020s American drama television series
2022 American television series debuts
English-language television shows
Hulu original programming
Television shows based on American novels
Television series by 20th Century Fox Television